Raoping County (postal: Jaoping) is a county in eastern Guangdong Province, bordering Fujian Province to the east, and facing the South China Sea to the south. The city with the same name has 135,600 inhabitants (1990).

It is under the jurisdiction of the prefecture-level city of Chaozhou. Teochew and Hakka (Raoping dialect) are spoken in Raoping.

Raoping is famous for its seafood and fruits.

Climate

Famous people
 Liu Kun
 Zhang Jingsheng (Sexologist)

See also
 Chaoshan

References

External links
Official website of Raoping County Government

County-level divisions of Guangdong
Chaozhou